is a passenger railway station located in the city of  Yokosuka, Kanagawa Prefecture, Japan, operated by the private railway company Keikyū.

Lines
Keikyū Nagasawa Station is served by the Keikyū Kurihama Line and is located 8.5 rail kilometers from the junction at Horinouchi Station, and 60.8 km from the starting point of the Keikyū Main Line at Shinagawa Station in Tokyo.

Platforms

History
It changed to its present name on June 1, 1987.

Keikyū introduced station numbering to its stations on 21 October 2010; Keikyū Nagasawa Station was assigned station number KK69.

Passenger statistics
In fiscal 2019, the station was used by an average of 7,232 passengers daily. 

The passenger figures for previous years are as shown below.

Surrounding area
 Nagasawa Sunlive Shopping Street
Yokosuka City Hall Kitashitaura Administration Center
Yokosuka City Kitashitaura Elementary School
Yokosuka City Kitashitaura Junior High School

See also
 List of railway stations in Japan

References

External links

 

Railway stations in Kanagawa Prefecture
Railway stations in Japan opened in 1966
Keikyū Kurihama Line
Railway stations in Yokosuka, Kanagawa